Dębina  is a neighbourhood of Lututów, Poland, located in the north-eastern part of the town.

References

Neighbourhoods in Poland
Wieruszów County